John J. Ely  (April 7, 1778 – January 11, 1852) was an American politician who served as the Director of the Monmouth County, New Jersey Board of Chosen Freeholders, and as Sheriff of Monmouth County, and as a member of the New Jersey General Assembly.

Biography
Elected sheriff in 1817, during the Era of Good Feelings, as a Democratic Republican, Ely served three, one-year terms, the constitutional term limit at the time.

In the March 1822 township elections, he was elected to represent Freehold Township on the Board of Chosen Freeholders. At the May 8, 1822 annual reorganization, he was chosen as Director of the Monmouth County, New Jersey Board of Chosen Freeholders, and served as Director until May 13, 1835, when he left the board.

In October 1822, Ely was elected to a one-year term representing Monmouth County in the New Jersey General Assembly.

As the Era of Good Feelings closed, Ely affiliated with the National Republican Party, and returned to the shrievalty in 1825. He served three years. In 1832 and 1833, he was the National Republican Candidate for the Monmouth County seat in the New Jersey Legislative Council, losing both times to Daniel Holmes.

In 1829, John J. Ely moved to Holmdel Township, where he died on January 11, 1852. He is buried in the Holmdel Baptist Churchyard.

A son, Horatio Ely, would go on to serve as sheriff from 1837 to 1838.

See also
List of Monmouth County Freeholder Directors

References

1852 deaths
1778 births
Members of the New Jersey General Assembly
County commissioners in New Jersey
People from Holmdel Township, New Jersey
Politicians from Monmouth County, New Jersey
New Jersey Democratic-Republicans
New Jersey National Republicans
Sheriffs of Monmouth County, New Jersey